Dieffenbachia , commonly known as dumb cane or leopard lily, is a genus of tropical flowering plants  in the family Araceae. It is native to the New World Tropics from Mexico and the West Indies south to Argentina. Some species are widely cultivated as ornamental plants, especially as houseplants, and have become naturalized on a few tropical islands.

Dieffenbachia is a perennial herbaceous plant with straight stem, simple and alternate leaves containing white spots and flecks, making it attractive as indoor foliage. Species in this genus are popular as houseplants because of their tolerance of shade. The English names, dumb cane and mother-in-law's tongue (also used for Sansevieria species) refer to the poisoning effect of raphides, which can cause temporary inability to speak. Dieffenbachia was named by Heinrich Wilhelm Schott, director of the Botanical Gardens in Vienna, to honor his head gardener Joseph Dieffenbach (1796–1863).

Species
The World Checklist of Selected Plant Families lists the following species:
Dieffenbachia aglaonematifolia Engl. – Brazil, Paraguay; Corrientes + Misiones Provinces of Argentina
Dieffenbachia antioquensis Linden ex Rafarin – Colombia
Dieffenbachia aurantiaca Engl – Costa Rica, Panama
Dieffenbachia beachiana Croat & Grayum – Costa Rica, Panama
Dieffenbachia bowmannii Carrière – Colombia, northwestern Brazil
Dieffenbachia brittonii Engl. – Colombia
Dieffenbachia burgeri Croat & Grayum – Costa Rica
Dieffenbachia cannifolia Engl. – Colombia, Ecuador, Peru
Dieffenbachia concinna Croat & Grayum – Costa Rica, Nicaragua
Dieffenbachia copensis Croat – Panama
Dieffenbachia cordata Engl. – Peru
Dieffenbachia costata Klotzsch ex Schott – Colombia, Ecuador, Peru
Dieffenbachia crebripistillata Croat – Panama
Dieffenbachia daguensis Engl. – Colombia, Ecuador
Dieffenbachia davidsei Croat & Grayum – Costa Rica
Dieffenbachia duidae (Steyerm.) G.S.Bunting – Venezuela, Guyana
Dieffenbachia elegans A.M.E.Jonker & Jonker – Bolivia, northwestern Brazil, the Guianas
Dieffenbachia enderi Engl. – Colombia
Dieffenbachia fortunensis Croat – Panama
Dieffenbachia fosteri Croat – Panama
Dieffenbachia fournieri N.E.Br. – Colombia
Dieffenbachia galdamesiae Croat – Panama
Dieffenbachia gracilis Huber – Peru, northwestern Brazil
Dieffenbachia grayumiana Croat – Costa Rica, Panama, Colombia
Dieffenbachia hammelii Croat & Grayum – Costa Rica, Nicaragua
Dieffenbachia herthae Diels – Ecuador
Dieffenbachia horichii Croat & Grayum – Costa Rica
Dieffenbachia humilis Poepp.  – Bolivia, Peru, Ecuador, northwestern Brazil, the Guianas
Dieffenbachia imperialis Linden & André – Peru
Dieffenbachia isthmia Croat – Panama
Dieffenbachia killipii Croat – Panama
Dieffenbachia lancifolia Linden & André – Colombia
Dieffenbachia leopoldii W.Bull – Colombia
Dieffenbachia longispatha Engl. & K.Krause – Panama, Colombia
Dieffenbachia lutheri Croat – Panama
Dieffenbachia macrophylla Poepp. – Peru
Dieffenbachia meleagris L.Linden & Rodigas – Ecuador
Dieffenbachia nitidipetiolata Croat & Grayum – Panama
Dieffenbachia obliqua Poepp.  – Peru
Dieffenbachia obscurinervia Croat – Panama
Dieffenbachia oerstedii Schott – southern Mexico (Veracruz, Tabasco, Campeche, Oaxaca, Chiapas), Central America (all 7 countries), Colombia
Dieffenbachia olbia L.Linden & Rodigas – Peru
Dieffenbachia paludicola N.E.Br. ex Gleason – northwestern Brazil, the Guianas, Venezuela
Dieffenbachia panamensis Croat – Panama
Dieffenbachia parlatorei Linden & André – Colombia, Venezuela
Dieffenbachia parvifolia Engl. – northwestern Brazil, Bolivia, Ecuador, Peru, Venezuela
Dieffenbachia pittieri Engl. & K.Krause  – Panama
Dieffenbachia seguine (Jacq.) Schott – West Indies, south to Brazil and Bolivia (syn. Dieffenbachia maculata, Dieffenbachia picta)
Dieffenbachia shuttleworthiana Regel – Colombia
Dieffenbachia standleyi Croat – Honduras
Dieffenbachia tonduzii Croat & Grayum – Nicaragua, Costa Rica, Panama, Colombia, Ecuador
Dieffenbachia weberbaueri Engl. – Peru
Dieffenbachia weirii Berk. – Colombia
Dieffenbachia wendlandii Schott – southern Mexico (Querétaro, Veracruz, Oaxaca, Chiapas) south to Panama
Dieffenbachia williamsii Croat – Bolivia
Dieffenbachia wurdackii Croat – Peru

Dieffenbachia includes a number of unresolved taxonomic names, such as Dieffenbachia amoena.

Ecology
In a survey that began in 1998, researchers in Costa Rica noticed that the strawberry poison frog Oophaga pumilio, deposited almost all (89%) of their tadpoles on the leaf axils of Dieffenbachia. As a result, the frog population fluctuated with the abundance of Dieffenbachia, especially in secondary forest. A majority of the plants were eradicated by 2012 when the surveyors returned to the same area, with only 28% of 2002 plant numbers remaining. Researchers concluded that the reason for the rapid decline in Dieffenbachia was due to increased abundance of the collared peccary Dicotyles tajacu in the La Selva Biological Station research area; a small pig-like animal that feeds on Dieffenbachia and other plants.

Cultivation
They need light, but filtered sunlight through a window is usually sufficient. They also need moderately moist soil, which should be regularly fertilized with a proprietary houseplant fertilizer. Leaves will periodically roll up and fall off to make way for new leaves. Yellowing of the leaves is generally a sign of problematic conditions, such as a nutrient deficiency in the soil. Dieffenbachia respond well to hot temperatures and dry climates.

Most require water about twice a week.

As Dieffenbachia seguine comes from the tropical rain forest, it prefers to have moisture at its roots, as it grows all the time, it needs constant water, but with loose well aerated soils.

The cultivars 'Camille'  and 'Tropic Snow' have gained the Royal Horticultural Society's Award of Garden Merit.

Toxicity
The cells of the Dieffenbachia plant contain needle-shaped calcium oxalate crystals called raphides. If a leaf is chewed, these crystals can cause a temporary burning sensation and erythema.  In rare cases, edema of tissues exposed to the plant has been reported.  Mastication and ingestion generally result in only mild symptoms. With both children and pets, contact with dieffenbachia (typically from chewing) can cause a host of unpleasant symptoms, including intense numbing, oral irritation, excessive drooling, and localized swelling.  However, these effects are rarely life-threatening. In most cases, symptoms are mild, and can be successfully treated with analgesic agents, antihistamines, or medical charcoal. Moreover, severe cases can occur if Dieffenbachia makes prolonged contact with oral mucosal tissue. In such cases, symptoms generally include severe pain which can last for several days to weeks. Hospitalization may be necessary if prolonged contact is made with the throat, in which severe swelling has the potential to affect breathing. Gastric evacuation or lavage is "seldom" indicated. In patients with exposure to toxic plants, 70% are children younger than 5 years.

Stories that Dieffenbachia is a deadly poison are urban legends.

References

Sources
Schott, H. W. and Kunst, W. Z. (1829). Für Liebhaber der Botanik.

External links

 Encyclopædia Britannica
 Clemson Home & Garden
 Medline Plus: Dieffenbachia
 Botanical Online: Dieffenbachia
 Speedup Video – Dieffenbachia growth

 
Aroideae
Araceae genera
Garden plants
House plants
Low light plants
Poisonous plants